James Moran (died 7 October 1938) was an Irish politician. He was an independent member of Seanad Éireann from 1922 to 1934. A company director and hotelier, he was nominated to the Seanad by the President of the Executive Council in 1922 for 12 years. He lost his seat at the 1934 Seanad election.

His second daughter, Frances Moran, became a leading barrister and Regius Professorship of Laws at Trinity College Dublin.

References

Year of birth missing
1938 deaths
Independent members of Seanad Éireann
Members of the 1922 Seanad
Members of the 1925 Seanad
Members of the 1928 Seanad
Members of the 1931 Seanad